"Walls" is a song by American rock band Kings of Leon, written by the band members Caleb, Nathan, Jared and Matthew Followill. It was released as a digital download on September 22, 2016, through RCA Records as the first promotional single from the band's seventh studio album, Walls (2016).

Music video
A music video to accompany the release of "Walls" was first released onto YouTube on September 22, 2016, at a total length of five minutes and 28 seconds.

Charts

Weekly charts

Certifications

Release history

References

2016 songs
Kings of Leon songs
Songs written by Caleb Followill
Songs written by Jared Followill
Songs written by Matthew Followill
Songs written by Nathan Followill
2016 singles
RCA Records singles
2010s ballads
Folk ballads